Bagerdan may refer to:
 Bagerdan-e Olya
 Bagerdan-e Sofla